This article lists historical events that occurred between 201–300 in modern-day Lebanon or regarding its people.

Administration 
Tyre was the capital of Phoenice,  but the Roman emperor Elagabalus (r. 218–222) raised his native Emesa (modern-day Homs) to co-capital, leading to a rivalry between the two cities as the head of the province.

Propraetorial Imperial Legates of Phoenicia

Events

200s 
 Domitius Leo Procillianus is Propraetorial Imperial Legate of Pheonicia .

 Roman Emperor Marcus Aurelius Severus Alexander, known simply as Severus Alexander, is born in 1 October 208, Arqa, in modern-day Lebanon.

210s

 The Phoenician-born Papinian, a celebrated Roman jurist, magister libellorum, attorney general (advocatus fisci) and, praetorian prefect is murdered in 212 AD. 
 D. Pius Cassius is Propraetorial Imperial Legate of Phoenicia, 213 AD.

 Septimius Severus' wife Julia Domna and son Caracalla tour in Baalbek,  215 AD.
 Marcus Julius Gessius Marcianus, native of Arqa and a Roman aristocrat and step-father of Severus Alexander, is murdered in 218 AD.

220s
 The Tyrian-born Ulpian, Latin: Gnaeus Domitius Annius Ulpianus; a Roman jurist and one of the great legal authorities, under Severus Alexander, serves as praetorian prefect from 222 AD.
 Ulpian is murdered in 228.

230s
 The Third century Crisis begins with the assassination of the Lebanese Roman emperor Severus Alexander, 21/22 March 235 AD.
 Porphyry of Tyre, a Neoplatonic philosopher, is born in Tyre, .
 Beirut is first mentioned in writing as a major center for the study of law in the works of Gregory Thaumaturgus, 238/239 AD.

250s
 Marinus is metropolitan bishop of Tyre, .
 Origen, an early Christian scholar, ascetic and theologian, dies in Tyre,  (aged ).

260s
 Salvius Theodorus is Propraetorial Imperial Legate of Phoenicia in 268 AD.

270s
 The Palmyrene empire is established in 270 AD with the start of Zenobia's expedition against the Tanukhids in the spring of the same year, leading to the occupation of Roman Phoenice by the Syrian Palmyrenes.

 Pagan temples are attested in a Greek inscription mentioning the date 272 AD found in the Mar Mama church in Ehden.
 The Palmyrene empire is reconquered by the Romans, 273 AD.
 A Roman mint is established in Tripolis, 273/274 AD.

280s

 Saint Moura, an Egyptian Saint that is almost exclusively celebrated amongst Maronites, is martyred in 283 AD, Ansena, Egypt.
 The Third century Crisis ends with the ascension of Diocletian and his implementation of reforms in 284 AD.
 L. Artorius Pius Maximus is Propraetorial Imperial Legate of Phoenicia in 284 AD.
 The Roman mint in Tripolis closes down in 286/287 AD.

290s
 Crispinus is Propraetorial Imperial Legate of Phoenicia, 292 – 293.
 Aquilina, a native of Byblos and a christian child, dies in 293 AD, shortly before the executioner could carry out the decapitation sentenced on her for her religion.

 Ananias "of Phoenicia" the Presbyter, Peter the prison guard, and seven soldiers, get martyred in the form of drowning after lengthy torture for their Christianity, 295 AD, Phoenicia.
 Gelasinus is martyred in Baalbek, 297 AD.

Ecclesiastical administration
The ecclesiastical administration of Pheonice paralleled the political, but with some differences. The bishop of Tyre emerged as the pre-eminent prelate of Phoenice by the mid-3rd century.

Military
Since the time of Septimius Severus, it had been the practice to assign not more than two legions to each frontier province, and, although in some provinces one legion was sometimes deemed sufficient, the upper limit was not exceeded. This policy appears to have been continued during the third century AD, as seen in the case of Aurelian raising the garrisons of Phoenice to the normal strength of two legions.

Education 

In 238 or 239 AD, Beirut was first mentioned in writing as a major center for the study of law in the panegyric of Gregory Thaumaturgus, the bishop of Neo-Caesarea The 3rd-century emperors Diocletian and Maximian issued constitutions exempting the students of the law school of Beirut from compulsory service in their hometowns.

See also 

 Palmyrene empire
 Canalizations of Zenobia

References

Sources 
 A.R. Birley, Septimius Severus: The African Emperor, Routledge, 2002
 
 
 
 
 
 
 Yammine, Fr. Youssef, Daleel Ehden, Editor El, 2000.
 
 
 Martindale, J. R.; Jones, A. H. M, The Prosopography of the Later Roman Empire, Vol. I AD 260–395, Cambridge University Press (1971)
 Linda Jones Hall, Roman Berytus: Beirut in late antiquity (2004)

History of Lebanon